Jill Kinmont Boothe (February 16, 1936 – February 9, 2012) was a notable American alpine ski racer. Her life story was turned into two major Hollywood movies The Other Side of the Mountain and its sequel The Other Side of the Mountain Part 2.

Born in Los Angeles, California, Kinmont grew up in Bishop and learned to ski race at Mammoth Mountain in the Sierra Nevada mountains. In early 1955, she was the reigning national champion in the slalom, and a top prospect for a medal at the 1956 Winter Olympics, a year away.

At age 18, Kinmont competed in the giant slalom at the prestigious Snow Cup in Alta, Utah, on January 30, 1955. She suffered a near-fatal accident which resulted in paralysis from the shoulders down. That same week, she had been featured on the cover of Sports Illustrated magazine, dated January 31, 1955.

Kinmont was engaged to ski racer and "daredevil" Dick Buek (1929–1957) at the time of his death, according to her autobiography.

After her rehabilitation, she went on to graduate from UCLA with a B.A. in German and earned a teaching credential from the University of Washington in Seattle. She had a long career as an educator, first in Washington and then in Beverly Hills, California. She taught special education at Bishop Union Elementary School from 1975 to 1996 in her hometown of Bishop. She was an accomplished painter who had many exhibitions of her artwork.

Kinmont was the subject of two movies: The Other Side of the Mountain in 1975, and The Other Side of the Mountain Part 2 in 1978. Both films starred Marilyn Hassett as Kinmont.

Following "fifteen long days of incessant questioning and picture-taking" by Life reporter Janet Mason and Life photographer  Burk Uzzle, Life magazine published a 14-page photographic article about Jill's status nine years after the accident.

At age forty, she married trucker John Boothe of Bishop in November 1976, and they made their home in Bishop until shortly before her death.

Jill Boothe died February 9, 2012, at Carson Tahoe Regional Medical Center. The cause of death was not released, and a report that Boothe died of complications related to surgery was not confirmed by the coroner. She lived 57 years past her paralyzing ski accident and is buried in the East Line Street Cemetery in Bishop.

Boothe was inducted into the National Ski Hall of Fame in 1967.

References

External links
National Ski Hall of Fame - Jill Kinmont, inducted 1967
Sports Illustrated cover, January 31, 1955
Apple Pie in Sun Valley
 Sports Illustrated, six months after accident, July 25, 1955 
Sports Illustrated - Jill Kinmont Boothe, 42 years later, February 24, 1997

Crowe, Jerry. "Jill Kinmont Boothe is still going strong more than 50 years after paralyzing skiing accident," Los Angeles Times, Sunday, May 22, 2011.
Photo tribute to Jill Kinmont-Boothe

1936 births
2012 deaths
21st-century American women
American disabled sportspeople
American female alpine skiers
People from Bishop, California
People with tetraplegia
Sportspeople from Los Angeles
Sportspeople from Washington (state)
University of California, Los Angeles alumni
Wheelchair users